Nicanor Jesús "Nick/Nicky" Pineda Perlas III (born January 10, 1950 in Manila, Philippines) is a Filipino activist and awardee of the Right Livelihood Award in 2003, which is often referred as an alternative Nobel Prize.

He serves at present as the Chairman of the board of directors and trustees of LifeBank, a rural bank and microfinancial institution in the Philippines.

Early life and education
Perlas is the son of Jesus C. Perlas, Sr. and Anunciacion M. Pineda. Raised into a Spanish Filipino family of Azucarera (sugar mill) owners, he finished his elementary education at the Ateneo de Manila University in 1964 and finished his secondary education in the same school in 1968. While spending his high school years at the Ateneo, he was the Athlete of the Year and the recipient of the Silver Medal of the school's Math and Science Club in 1968.

Perlas pursued his undergraduate studies at the College of Agriculture in Xavier University - Ateneo de Cagayan. With the highest honors, he graduated Bachelor of Science in Agriculture, major in Agronomy and minor in Agricultural Economics in the said educational institution in 1972. He would then seek to pursue his master's studies at the University of the Philippines Los Baños, but would soon be forced to abandon his studies after being involved in the opposition of the Bataan nuclear power plant under the presidency of Ferdinand Marcos.

Personal life
He was married to American citizen Kathryn Carpenter. Now divorced. Together they have had one son, Christopher Michael Perlas.

LifeBank

Nicanor Perlas sits as the Chairman of the Board of Trustees/Corporation of LifeBank, a  microfinancial institution and rural bank in the Philippines.

LifeBank which is founded in 1970 is divided into two corporate arms each with its own different banking/financing functions - the LifeBank - A Rural Bank (LifeBank RB) and LifeBank Microfinance Foundation, Inc. (LifeBank MFI).

LifeBank RB is one of the fastest growing rural banks supervised under the jurisdiction of the Bangko Sentral ng Pilipinas (BSP). As of 2020, it operates 4 bank branches and 31 branch-lite units (BLUs) in Western Visayas.

The LifeBank MFI or LifeBank Microfinance, is an offshoot of LifeBank founded in 2003. Presently, it operates as a non-governmental organization (NGO) microfinance institution (MFI) with 477 branches and 20+ zonal and district offices across the Philippines covering 300,000+ loan clients and 400,000+ saving deposits clients. It is the 3rd largest microfinance institution in the country.

LifeBank MFI is also involved in social responsible programs by the Perlas Group/LifeBank Group. Its social and sustainable development programs created a nearly 2000 academic scholars across, built public buildings for government use, promoted healthcare through medical missions in far flung areas, among others, across the Philippines.

Activism
In his university days, Perlas was one of the key organizers of a university-wide education reform movement that resulted in changes in university policies. During this time, he founded the first ecological society in the Philippines. After graduation, he co-organized a successful large scale global campaign, the first of its kind during his time, to halt 12 nuclear plants in the Philippines. Perlas subsequently become a technical adviser to the Presidential Commission on the Philippine Nuclear Power Plant, Office of the President of the Philippines, where he was instrumental in stopping the operation of the fully constructed and operational Bataan Nuclear Power Plant, a $2.2 billion project plagued with design, construction, location, and corruption problems.

Shortly thereafter, Perlas was appointed member of the national technical panel overseeing the regulation of pesticide use in Philippine agriculture. While in this capacity, he simultaneously mobilized and headed a national effort that resulted in the banning of 32 hazardous pesticide formulations in the Philippines. The ban triggered the creation of a P750 million government program to reduce the use of pesticides in Philippine agriculture.

In parallel with these efforts, Perlas pioneered the introduction of large scale commercial organic and biodynamic agriculture in many provinces in the Philippines. All these efforts were the fruition of early advocacies in sustainable agriculture when he was still an agricultural journalist and columnist at the Modern Agriculture and Industry-Asia, where he pioneered the first monthly articles on ecological agriculture in the Asian context. Together with colleagues at the International Alliance for Sustainable Agriculture or IASA, he coined the term sustainable agriculture in 1983, a term which has received wide use and currency until today.

Perlas was the chief negotiator for a network of national networks, which involved 5000 organizations, that successfully stopped the agenda of radical and one sided liberalization in the Asia Pacific Economic Cooperation or APEC. He successfully introduced strong sustainable development language in the Leaders and Ministerial Declarations in APEC, and constrained the Individual Action Plan of the Philippines to abide by sustainable development principles. The successful negotiations prevented the premature exposure and economic decline of 3 million Philippine rice farmers to subsidized and artificially cheap rice coming from other countries.

Projects and offices
Perlas is the co-founder, president and executive director of the Center for Alternative Development Initiatives or CADI, in Metro Manila and Iloilo City, where he guides research and policy work and develops initiatives on globalization, threefolding and their impacts on civil society, cultural power and sustainable development.

He is also the co-founder and spokesperson of Karangalan which hosted a series of national conferences highlighting important global and national innovations and achievements by Filipinos in many disciplines and fields. Karangalan aims to stimulate the creation of a visionary Philippines. The 1st National Conference and Festival on “Mobilizing Excellence for Creating a Visionary Philippines” was January 21–23, 2005 at the Cultural Center of the Philippines, in partnership with over 40 organizations and networks.

Perlas was the chief facilitator and co-founder of the ABS-CBN "Forum on the Filipino Future", held on December 16, 2004. He was Chairman, Adviser on Strategy and Integral Sustainable Development, and Member, Board of Directors, LifeBank ARB, and Board of Trustees of LifeBank MFI, both of which help close to more than 400,000 (both LifeBank ARB and LifeBank MFI) economically poor families through microfinance and other lending products offerings.

He has been chairman of several national civil society networks including the Green Forum Philippines, the Philippine Sustainable Agriculture Coalition, and the Civil Society Counterpart Council for Sustainable Development.

Social Three-Folding

Co-founder the Global Network for Social Three-Folding, Globenet3 or GN3, with more than 17 geographic and functional nodes in over 12 countries in Asia, Europe, Africa, and the United States of America. GN3 advances profound societal transformation towards integral sustainable development on the basis of socially-engaged spirituality and deep substantive inner change.

Co-founder and spokesperson for Tindog Pilipinas! A national movement for a better Philippines, Professionals for Social Responsibility, and the Philippine Advancement and Renewal through Threefolding Networking, Research & Service, or PARTNERS, which is the Philippine node for GlobeNet3.

Philippine Agenda 21

In the mid-1990s he was one of two technical writers of Philippine Agenda 21 or PA21, which is a creative response to the challenges of elite globalization. He was one of the official civil society delegates from the Philippines at the Earth Summit in Rio. It was out of this experience, among others, that he helped shape the process and substance of PA21. Having emerged from more than 26 regional and national consultations, PA21 was characterized by the former Philippine president as the most consultative policy document in post-martial law Philippines. PA21 is still officially the blueprint for sustainable development in the Philippines, although presently marginalized by the current controversial government of the Philippines.

He was also the technical writer of SIAD: Framework for the Localization of Philippine Agenda 21, which is now used by a number of local governments and civil society organizations to advance sustainable integrated area development in towns.

Speaking and Consultancy
Perlas has been the resource person and keynote speaker in over 70 global conferences and events in over 20 countries, and over 120 national conferences on a range of topics including culture and societal transformation, integral sustainable development, globalization, technology, corporate social responsibility, science and spirituality, social threefolding, strategic microfinance, direct democracy and others.

He has provided consultancy work for several UN agencies, the Philippine Senate, donor agencies and foundations, as well as many other global and national civil society organizations and networks and businesses striving for ecological and social responsibility.

As a technical writer and key formulator of Philippine Agenda 21, as well as co-chair for the Civil Society of the Philippine Council for Sustainable Development, Office of the President of the Philippines, Perlas was invited to attend several UN meetings including the UN General Assembly on Sustainable Development, UNGASS and the UN Commission on Sustainable Development, 6th Session, as Technical Adviser to the Philippine Delegation to the UN.

Member, Mikhail Gorbachev’s Commission on Globalization 

Creative Member, Club of Budapest, Recognized as “highly creative innovators for a social and ecological sustainable world and a culture of peace”.
Agenda 21 is a program of action into the 21st century for bringing the Earth into a sustainable future. It was adopted by the participating governments of the world in the United Nations Conference on Environment and Development (UNCED), otherwise known as the Earth Summit, in Rio de Janeiro, Brazil in June 1992.

Training
Perlas has conducted hundreds of training sessions in the Philippines and abroad on a wide range of topics convergent with his writings. In this context he has innovated and developed a new framework for advancing integral sustainable development through the harmonious weaving together of profound inner change and radical but peaceful societal transformation. He calls this new framework the Lemniscate Process, which integrates the substance of more than two dozen disciplines and fields, all geared towards unlocking human creativity, enthusiasm and commitment for creating a better world.

Nicanor Perlas is part of the faculty at the graduate program of the Southeast Asian Interdisciplinary Development Institute (SAIDI). Perlas was a professor at the accredited Doctoral program on Applied Cosmic Anthropology of the Asian Social Institute, where he gave in depth theoretical and practical elaborations of the Lemniscate Process. He is also a board member and a resource person for training programs of the Gamot Cogon Institute or GCI, based in Iloilo, Philippines.

Writings
Perlas has written over 500 articles, editorials, monographs and books on a range of topics including globalization, social threefolding, conscious evolution, civil society, multiple intelligence, creativity, cultural power, philosophy of science and biology, technological singularity, sustainable agriculture, appreciative inquiry, neurophysiology and consciousness, anthroposophy, good governance, new politics, associative economics, and the integration of inner change and large-scale societal transformation.

He is the publisher and editor-in-chief for TruthForce! A national and global internet-based news and analysis service which reaches thousands of subscribers and readers in over 60 countries.

Formerly, he was Editor-In-Chief, Ikabuhi Newspaper for Micro-Entrepreneurs (34,000 + circulation)

His book, Shaping Globalization: Civil Society, Cultural Power, and Threefolding, has been translated in 9 languages. It is being used in dozens of universities in the Philippines and various parts of the world.

Presidential Candidate in 2010
On June 17, 2009, Nicanor Perlas announced his intentions to become one of the candidates for the Philippine Presidential Elections in May 2010.  He announced this during a press conference at the Bantayog ng mga Bayani in Quezon City.  He was a Philippine presidential aspirant for the 2010 presidential elections but lost to Liberal Party's President Benigno S. Aquino III.

A month before the Philippines would begin the first automated local and national elections, Perlas petitioned but failed to get the nod of the Commission on Elections to postpone the polls for 90 days, citing irregularities of Comelec to assure that all is set for the election to take place.

Awards
His awards include the William F. Masterson award, the top award for outstanding alumni of Xavier University for his national and global contributions to sustainable agriculture.

He also received highest honors and was valedictorian of his graduating class in the College of Agriculture at Xavier University - Ateneo de Cagayan with a Bachelor of Science in Agriculture, major in Agronomy and minor in Agricultural Economics.

In 2003, he was awarded the Right Livelihood Award for his work as an environmental activist.

References

Bibliography
 Shaping Globalization : Civil Society, Cultural Power and Threefolding (2000)
 Nicanor Perlas' Personal Decision to Serve His Country (2009)
 Mission Possible! Sow Courage; Harvest a New World. (2011)

External links
Official Website of Nicanor Perlas
Center for Development Alternatives website
Global 500 forum prize
GlobeNet3 website
Truthforce! website
Website for M.I.S.S.I.O.N: Movement of Imaginals for a Sustainable Society through Initiatives, Organizing, and Networking

1950 births
Ateneo de Manila University alumni
Filipino activists
Filipino environmentalists
Green thinkers
Living people
Candidates in the 2010 Philippine presidential election
University of the Philippines Los Baños alumni
Independent politicians in the Philippines
Xavier University – Ateneo de Cagayan alumni